Philip Endicott "Skipper" Young (December 1, 1885 - June 17, 1955) was the founder of Titleist.

Personal life
Young was born on December 1, 1885, in Dorchester, Massachusetts to Rev. George H. Young, a Unitarian minister, and his second wife, Elizabeth, the daughter of Augustus Bradford Endicott. He had a sister, Eleanor Guild. The family moved to Dedham, Massachusetts when Young was a child. Young earned a degree in mechanical engineering from the Massachusetts Institute of Technology with the class of 1909.

With his wife, Edith ( Ames), he had a son, Richard, born in 1916, and a daughter, Edith, born in 1911. He also had two sisters, Eleanor Guild and Shelia Young. Edith grew up about a half a mile away from Young. They both attended the Dedham Public Schools and were childhood sweethearts. The couple was married in 1910.

He lived at 8 Fort St. in Fairhaven and spent his winters in Coral Gables, Florida. He was a member of the Wamsutta Club and New Bedford Country Club in Massachusetts, and the Riviera Club in Florida, and the  He died June 17, 1955. He was an avid sailor.

Career
Early in his career, Young worked for Goodyear. In 1910, Young started the Acushnet Company with the financial backing of Allen Weeks, a fraternity brother from MIT.

When playing a round of golf with his dentist, Young missed a putt. Surprised, Young believed the miss was caused by the weight of the ball and asked his dentist friend to x-ray the ball. The x-rays confirmed his suspicions that the rubber core was off-center. Young took x-rays of more golf balls and found similar results. The off-center cores made the balls prone to erratic shots. Young then developed a way to create golf balls with perfect cores. Young founded Titleist in 1932 as a subsidiary of the Acushnet Company.

Notes

References

Businesspeople from Dedham, Massachusetts
Massachusetts Institute of Technology alumni
People from Fairhaven, Massachusetts
People from Coral Gables, Florida
1885 births
1955 deaths
People from Dorchester, Massachusetts